Bradford North was a borough constituency represented in the House of Commons of the Parliament of the United Kingdom. Until it was abolished for the 2010 general election, it elected one Member of Parliament (MP) by the first past the post system of election.

Boundaries
1918–1950: The County Borough of Bradford wards of Allerton, Bolton, Eccleshill, Heaton, Idle, and Thornton.

1950–1955: The County Borough of Bradford wards of Allerton, Bolton, Eccleshill, Heaton, and Idle.

1955–1974: The County Borough of Bradford wards of Bolton, Bradford Moor, Eccleshill, Idle, and North East.

1974–1983: The County Borough of Bradford wards of Bolton, Bowling, Bradford Moor, Eccleshill, Idle, Laisterdyke, and Undercliffe.

1983–2010: The City of Bradford wards of Bolton, Bowling, Bradford Moor, Eccleshill, Idle, and Undercliffe.

The constituency covered the northern part of Bradford.

Following the review of parliamentary representation in West Yorkshire by the Boundary Commission for England, Bradford was significantly altered, and the resulting constituency was renamed as Bradford East, with effect from the 2010 general election.

Members of Parliament

Elections
This constituency was replaced by Bradford East for the 2010 general election.

Elections in the 1910s

Elections in the 1920s

Elections in the 1930s 

{{Election box candidate|
|party      = National Dividend
|candidate  = Reginald Kenney
|votes  = 4,684
|percentage  = 11.7
|change  = ''New}}General Election 1939–40:

Another General Election was required to take place before the end of 1940. The political parties had been making preparations for an election to take place from 1939 and by the end of this year, the following candidates had been selected; National Labour: George R CarterLabour''': Muriel Nichol

Elections in the 1940s

Elections in the 1950s

Elections in the 1960s

Elections in the 1970s

Elections in the 1980s

Elections in the 1990s

Elections in the 2000s

See also 
 List of parliamentary constituencies in West Yorkshire

Notes and references 
Craig, F. W. S. (1983). British parliamentary election results 1918-1949 (3 ed.). Chichester: Parliamentary Research Services. .

Constituencies of the Parliament of the United Kingdom established in 1918
Constituencies of the Parliament of the United Kingdom disestablished in 2010
Politics of Bradford
Parliamentary constituencies in Yorkshire and the Humber (historic)